The Château de Bazoches is located in Bazoches, the modern region of Bourgogne-Franche-Comté, historically part of the Burgundy region of France.

History
The original castle was built by Jean de Saillenay in 1180, on the site of a Roman outpost guarding the road between Autun and the administrative centre of Gallia Lugdunensis, now Sens. The design was a standard trapezoidal layout, with four towers and a keep surrounding an inner courtyard, upgraded in the 14th century.

It was sold to Jean de Bazoches in 1284 and successively owned by the Chastellux, Montmorillon and La Perrière families. In 1570, Jacques Le Prestre de Vauban acquired it when he married Françoise de la Perrière, an illegitimate daughter of the Count de Bazoches.

In 1675, Jacques Le Prestre's grandson, the military engineer Vauban, purchased the property from his cousin with money awarded by Louis XIV for his role in the capture of Maastricht in 1673, and it was extensively upgraded.

Today it is private property and classified as a listed Historic building.

Gallery

References

See also
List of castles in France

Châteaux in Bourgogne-Franche-Comté
Buildings and structures in Nièvre
Monuments historiques of Bourgogne-Franche-Comté
Maisons des Illustres